Simon Greul was the champion in 2008, but he decided to not defend his title.
Jan Hájek won this tournament, by defeating Laurent Recouderc 2–6, 6–3, 7–6(7–5) in the final.

Seeds

Draw

Final four

Top half

Bottom half

References
 Main Draw
 Qualifying Draw

2009 ATP Challenger Tour
2009 Singles